Uh-oh is the sixth studio album by American rock group Cowboy Mouth.

Track listing
"Tomorrow Never Knows"
"Disconnected"
"Tell The Girl"
"Friends"
"Uh-Oh"
"So Much the Better"
"Can't Stay Here"
"Better"
"Invincible"
"Be That Way"
"Trouble"
"Senseless"
"Bad Girl"

Personnel 
Cowboy Mouth
 Fred LeBlanc – drums, lead vocals
 John Thomas Griffith – guitar, vocals
 Mary LaSang – bass guitar, vocals
 Paul Sanchez – guitar

2006 albums
Cowboy Mouth albums